Apalkov is a Russian masculine surname, its feminine counterpart is Apalkova. It may refer to
Daniil Apalkov (born 1992), Russian professional ice hockey player
Eduard Apalkov (born 1970), Russian football player

Russian-language surnames